The Vern Riffe State Office Tower is a  skyscraper on Capitol Square in downtown Columbus, Ohio. It was completed in 1988 and has 32 floors. NBBJ designed the building, which is the fifth-tallest in Columbus, and has 102,192 m² of floor area. An earlier concept for the site, also designed by NBBJ, would have included a site to the west of the present location, and would have effectively closed off South Wall Street north of West State Street. The building was named for Vernal G. Riffe, Jr, who served as Speaker of the Ohio House of Representatives from 1975 to 1994. The complex also contains the 854-seat Capitol Theatre.

The project was completed for $130 million.

The working office of Ohio Governor Mike DeWine is located on the building's 30th floor.

See also
List of tallest buildings in Columbus, Ohio

References

External links
 
Emporis
Skyscraperpage

Skyscraper office buildings in Columbus, Ohio
Buildings in downtown Columbus, Ohio
Government buildings in Columbus, Ohio
Government buildings completed in 1988
Office buildings completed in 1988
1980s architecture in the United States
NBBJ buildings
High Street (Columbus, Ohio)